Galapagos is a 1955 travel and nature documentary film made by explorer Thor Heyerdahl, showing the flora and fauna of the Galapagos archipelago.

External links

1955 documentary films
1955 films
Films directed by Thor Heyerdahl
Films set on the Galápagos Islands
Norwegian documentary films
Travelogues